Tetley's may refer to:

Tetley, a brand of tea
Tetley's Bitter, a brand of beer
Tetley's brewery, brewery in Leeds which brews the above beer.
Tetley's Stadium, a stadium in Dewsbury, West Yorkshire sponsored by Tetley's Bitter